Sara Blengsli Kværnø (born 28 July 1982) is a Norwegian badminton player, born in Namsos. She competed in women's singles at the 2012 Summer Olympics in London. She was ranked 104th in the world when entering the 2012 Summer Olympics. She was the first female badminton player to represent Norway at the Olympics.

References

External links 
 

1982 births
Living people
People from Namsos
Norwegian female badminton players
Badminton players at the 2012 Summer Olympics
Olympic badminton players of Norway
Sportspeople from Trøndelag